Mohammad Reza Ghobishavi (born 	January 24, 2000) is an Iranian footballer who plays as a midfielder for Iranian club Sanat Naft in the Persian Gulf Pro League.

Club career

Sanat Naft
He made his debut for Sanat Naft Abadan in 25th fixtures of 2017–18 Iran Pro League against Siah Jamegan.

Honours

International 
Iran U16
 AFC U-16 Championship runner-up: 2016

References

Living people
2000 births
Association football midfielders
Iranian footballers
Sanat Naft Abadan F.C. players
People from Abadan, Iran
Sportspeople from Khuzestan province